The Housing Corporation (Delegation) etc. Act 2006 (c 27) is an Act of the Parliament of the United Kingdom. It was enacted because it was discovered that the Housing Corporation had been delegating its functions without lawful authority. Its purpose was to retroactively legalise this.

Section 1 - Power of Housing Corporation to delegate functions etc.
Section 1(1) inserted paragraph 6A of Schedule 6 to the Housing Associations Act 1985. It was repealed for England and Wales on 1 April 2009.

Sections 1(2) to (4) read:

Section 2
Section 2(1) authorises the citation of this Act by a short title and section 2(2) provides its extent.

See also
Delegatus non potest delegare
Ex post facto law

References
Halsbury's Statutes,
Hansard

External links
The Housing Corporation (Delegation) etc. Act 2006, as amended from the National Archives.
The Housing Corporation (Delegation) etc. Act 2006, as originally enacted from the National Archives.
Explanatory notes to the Bill for this Act prepared on 15 May 2006.

United Kingdom Acts of Parliament 2006